Pincourt is a municipality on the island of Île Perrot, off the western tip of the island of Montreal, Quebec. The population as of the Canada 2011 Census was 14,305. The town shares the island with the three other municipalities of Notre-Dame-de-l'Île-Perrot, Terrasse Vaudreuil and L'Île-Perrot, bordering on each one. The south end of the Ottawa River (Rivière des Outaouais) flows between Vaudreuil-Dorion and Pincourt, defining the town's western boundary.

Many houses, condos and townhouses are newly built as the town has undergone a building boom, which also included the opening of the new francophone Chêne-Bleu high school. The municipality also has two bilingual primary schools and one French primary school. Several parks and natural protected areas are open throughout the year for recreation.

History
Settlement of the area began in 1754 when Jean-Baptiste Leduc, the island's fifth Lord from 1751 to 1785, started to grant concessions. By the end of the 18th century, there were 22 concessions and lots began to be sold along the Ottawa River to merchants and specialists, such as blacksmiths, cask makers, cobblers, weavers, and inn keepers.

In 1855, the Grand Trunk Railway was built on Ile Perrot, resulting in significant growth of the village. In 1890, a mission was established, since the parish church of Notre-Dame-de-l'Île-Perrot was considered too far away by its residents.

The Village Municipality of Pincourt was created in 1950, out of the Parish Municipality of Notre-Dame-de-l'Île-Perrot. It was named after its post office that was established in 1932. The name Pincourt, first mentioned in 1776, referred to a former forest on the western side of Ile Perrot with short pines (pins courts in French), that served as a landmark for early travelers to the area.

In 1959, Pincourt changed statutes from village municipality to ville. Since then, the town has become a residential suburb, growing rapidly in the 1960s due to several real estate developments.

Demographics 

Local government
List of former mayors:
 Darie Huneault (1950–1955)
 Roland Loiselle (1955–1958)
 Valentino D'Ambrosio (1958–1967)
 Paul-Émile Martel (1967–1970)
 Jeannette Burley (1970–1974)
 Romual Sénéchal (1974–1982)
 Lorne Brown (1982–1986)
 Michel Kandyba (1986–2009)
 Yvan Cardinal (2009–2021)
 Claude Comeau (2021–present)

Transportation
Quebec Autoroute 20 runs along the north end of Pincourt and is accessible via Boulevard Cardinal Léger (exit 35), the only proper exit overpass along the section of the highway from Autoroute 30 to the island of Montréal, all others consisting of at-grade intersections with traffic lights. There is one other autoroute junction for Pincourt consisting of an at-grade intersection at Boulevard de l'Île.

On the city's western border, the Taschereau Bridge crosses the Ottawa River to Vaudreuil-Dorion.

There is a shuttle bus service that runs during rush hours operated by CIT La Presqu'Île connecting to the Vaudreuil-Hudson commuter train line. The CIT also offers various bus connections to Vaudreuil-Dorion, Sainte-Anne-de-Bellevue and other West-Island destinations.

Education
Commission Scolaire des Trois-Lacs operates Francophone schools.
 École secondaire du Chêne-Bleu
 École Notre-Dame-de-Lorette 
 Some areas are zoned to École Virginie-Roy in L'Île-Perrot

Lester B. Pearson School Board operates Anglophone schools. It is zoned to Edgewater Elementary School and St. Patrick Elementary School.

See also
 List of towns in Quebec

References

External links

 Official website

Cities and towns in Quebec
Incorporated places in Vaudreuil-Soulanges Regional County Municipality
Greater Montreal